A list of American films released in 1908.

See also
 1908 in the United States

External links

1908 films at the Internet Movie Database

1908
Films
American
1900s in American cinema